The 2021 European Cadets Wrestling Championships (U17) was the 23rd edition of European Cadets Wrestling Championship of combined events, and took place from June 14 to 20 in Samokov, Bulgaria.

Medal table

Team ranking

Medal summary

Men's freestyle

Men's Greco-Roman

Women's freestyle

References

External links 

Wrestling
European Wrestling Cadet Championships
European Wrestling Cadet Championships
European Wrestling Cadet Championships